Venus Williams was the defending champion and successfully defended her title by defeating Jelena Dokic 6–2, 6–2 in the final.

Seeds
All seeds received a bye into the second round.

Draw

Finals

Top half

Section 1

Section 2

Bottom half

Section 3

Section 4

External links
 Main and qualifying rounds

Southern California Open
Acura Classic - Singles